Stanisław Edward Parzymies (born 11 October 1938 in Krasnystaw) is a Polish international relations scholar, an expert on French-German relations. He is a former Chairman of the Scientific Board at the Institute of International Relations and the Head of the European Integration Section of the Institute of International Relations, University of Warsaw.

References

External links 
Stanisław Edward Parzymies (Nauka Polska) 

Living people
1938 births